Nikolai Ivanovich Il'minskii (1822–1891) was a Russian professor of Turkish languages at Kazan University and known as "Enlightener of Natives". 

Following a highly successful career as an academic linguist, he devoted himself to missionary work on behalf of the Russian Orthodox Church. Based around his view that mother tongue instruction was the key factor in ensuring that animists, he developed the Ilminsky Method. In 1863, Ilminsky started teaching Oriental languages ​​at the Kazan Theological Seminary, with work on teaching aids for Tatars in the Tatar language. This is the site where Iliminsky deployed his idea of mother tongue instruction with the Ilminsky method. After this he helped co-found the translation commission under the brotherhood of St. Gurias. Which by 1904, produced works in 23 different languages. Ilminsky is also described by Nicholas Zernov as being a major contributor to translations of bibles to many Asiatic languages. Nicholas also comments that Ilmisky could speak Arabic, Persian, Turkish, Tatar, Cheremis, Chuvash, Kirgiz, Mordvin, Yakut and more Asiatic languages. 

He worked closely with the educator Ilya Ulyanov and his model of education, described as "national in form, Orthodox in content" can be considered an influence on Ulyanov's son Vladimir Lenin who developed an approach which was described as "national in form, socialist in content".

References

Weblinks 
 Профессор Н.И.Егоров. Выступление на чувашском языке (Круглый стол, посвященный к 195-летию со дня рождения Н.И. Ильминского, 120-летию Н.Н. Поппе и 145-летию К.П. Прокопьева). Чăвашла.
 Сергей Щербаков: Миссионерско-просветительская система Н.И. Ильминского и чуваши: две стороны одной медали
 Agabazar: Сумбур вместо гармонии

1822 births
1891 deaths
Russian orientalists
Linguists of Turkic languages
Corresponding members of the Saint Petersburg Academy of Sciences
Recipients of the Order of St. Anna, 2nd class
Recipients of the Order of Saint Stanislaus (Russian), 3rd class
Burials at Arskoe Cemetery